James Michalanney is a former Australian rules footballer who played for the Norwood Football Club in the South Australian National Football League (SANFL).

Known as a tall and strong-marking forward with the nicknames "Big Jim" and "Piano" for his perfect set of white teeth, Michalanney was part of four Norwood premierships. He was forced to miss the whole of the 1980 SANFL season due to a mystery groin complaint which was eventually diagnosed as deep-seated pelvic bone damage. During that time, Michalanney took up croquet at the Norwood Club and won the 1980 South Australian All Grades Doubles Championship, a handicap trophy.

In 1984, he was awarded Life Membership of the Norwood Football Club.

Michalanney worked as a school teacher during his playing days, and later became principal of Murray Bridge High School. He has five children: William, Charlotte, Tom, Max and Jack. His son Max has also become a footballer, selected by the Adelaide Crows with pick 17 of the 2022 AFL Draft.

References

External links

Year of birth missing (living people)
Living people
Norwood Football Club players
South Australian State of Origin players